This article summarizes equations in the theory of quantum mechanics.

Wavefunctions

A fundamental physical constant occurring in quantum mechanics is the Planck constant, h.

The general form of wavefunction for a system of particles, each with position ri and z-component of spin sz i. Sums are over the discrete variable sz, integrals over continuous positions r.

For clarity and brevity, the coordinates are collected into tuples, the indices label the particles (which cannot be done physically, but is mathematically necessary). Following are general mathematical results, used in calculations.

Equations

Wave–particle duality and time evolution

Non-relativistic time-independent Schrödinger equation

Summarized below are the various forms the Hamiltonian takes, with the corresponding Schrödinger equations and forms of wavefunction solutions. Notice in the case of one spatial dimension, for one particle, the partial derivative reduces to an ordinary derivative.

Non-relativistic time-dependent Schrödinger equation

Again, summarized below are the various forms the Hamiltonian takes, with the corresponding Schrödinger equations and forms of solutions.

Photoemission

Quantum uncertainty

Angular momentum

Magnetic moments

In what follows, B is an applied external magnetic field and the quantum numbers above are used.

The Hydrogen atom

See also

Defining equation (physical chemistry)
List of electromagnetism equations
List of equations in classical mechanics
List of equations in fluid mechanics
List of equations in gravitation
List of equations in nuclear and particle physics
List of equations in wave theory
List of photonics equations
List of relativistic equations

Footnotes

Sources

Further reading

 
 
 
 

Physical quantities
SI units
Physical chemistry
Equations of physics